XHNP-FM is a radio station on 89.3 FM in Puebla, Puebla, Mexico. The station is owned by Cinco Radio and carries a regional Mexican format known as La Grupera.

History
XHNP received its first concession on April 17, 1975. It was owned by Ramón Bojalil Bojalil until the concession was sold in 2000.

References

1975 establishments in Mexico
Mass media in Puebla (city)
Radio stations established in 1975
Radio stations in Puebla
Regional Mexican radio stations
Spanish-language radio stations